Qalandarabad Rural District is a rural district (dehestan) in Qalandarabad District, Fariman County, Razavi Khorasan Province, Iran. At the 2006 census, its population was 10,243, in 2,338 families.  The rural district has 38 villages.

References 

Rural Districts of Razavi Khorasan Province
Fariman County